Fichtelis a German-language surname.

Anja Fichtel, German fencer
Brad Fichtel, American footballer
Bronisław Fichtel, Polish footballer
 (1732-1795) Austrian mineralogist and civil servant
Klaus Fichtel, German footballer
 (1770-1810), Austrian paleontologist

See also